The Embassy of Poland in Moscow is the diplomatic mission of the Republic of Poland to the Russian Federation. The chancery is located at Klimashkina Street 4, Moscow.

The Polish embassy occupies a purpose-built building of modernist design, incorporating Polish national motifs which is sited on a special diplomatic compound just outside Moscow's 'Garden Ring'. The compound is, in accordance with diplomatic protocol, considered part of the territory of the Polish Republic; for this reason the ambassador's residence as well as apartments for a number of other diplomatic staff are located there, alongside the chancery and consular buildings.

The embassy served as the primary target for groups wishing to express their disagreement with the directives of the late president Lech Kaczyński.

See also
List of ambassadors of Poland to Russia
Poland–Russia relations
 We will bury you

References

External links

Embassy of Poland in Moscow 

Poland
Moscow
Poland–Russia relations